Deponia may refer to:

 Deponia (video game), a 2012 point-and-click adventure game
 Chaos on Deponia, second installment in the series
 Goodbye Deponia, third installment in the series
 Deponia Doomsday, fourth installment in the series
 Deponija (disambiguation)